The Salvador Dalí House-Museum is the house in Portlligat, Catalonia, Spain, where Salvador Dalí lived and worked from 1930 to 1982. After the death of his wife Gala Dalí, he took up residence at Púbol Castle.

History
The house, formerly a number of small fisherman's huts, has a labyrinthine structure which from one point of departure, the Bear Lobby, spreads out and winds around in a succession of zones linked by narrow corridors, slight changes of level, and blind passageways. 

All the rooms have windows of different shapes and proportions framing the same landscape that is a constant point of reference in Dalí's work: the Portlligat bay.

Gallery

References

External links

 

Alt Empordà
Art museums and galleries in Catalonia
Artists' studios in Spain
Biographical museums in Spain
Historic house museums in Catalonia
Salvador Dalí